Robert Gibb may refer to:

Robert Gibb (courtier) (1490-1558), Scottish courtier
Robert Gibb (poet) (born 1946), American poet
Robert Gibb (1845–1932), Scottish painter
Bobby Gibb (1902–1953), Australian rules footballer with South Melbourne

See also

Gibb (surname)
Robert Gibbs (disambiguation)

Robert (disambiguation)
Gibb (disambiguation)